Tudi Joanne Roche (born July 19, 1955) is an American actress and singer. She is best known for her recurring role as Carrie on the sitcom Home Improvement (1995–1998).

Personal life 
Roche was born in San Angelo, Texas. She attended Texas Christian University, but did not graduate. She has been married to actor Richard Karn since 1985. They have a son.

Filmography

Film

Television

Video games

References

External links 
 
 

1955 births
20th-century American actresses
21st-century American actresses
Actresses from Texas
American film actresses
American stage actresses
American television actresses
American voice actresses
Living people
People from San Angelo, Texas